Nephrotomy describes a surgical procedure in which an incision in the kidney is made.

See also 
 List of surgeries by type

References

Urologic surgery